Fermana Football Club is an Italian association football club based in Fermo, Marche. The club currently play in Serie C, the third tier of Italian football after achieving promotion by winning Group F in the 2016-17 Serie D season.

History

Foundation 
The club was founded in 1920 as S.S. La Fermo and was renamed in 1924 U.S. Fermana after the merger with Fermo F.C..

Fermana 1920 
In 1999 Fermana won the Serie C1/B title under head coach Ivo Iaconi, thus ensuring a historical first appearance into Serie B.  That season proved to be the only one, as they were promptly relegated back into Serie C1.

Fermana relegated to Serie C2 after a disappointing 2005–06 Serie C1/A campaign ended in a poor last place, and 13 points in 34 matches. Following this relegation the club, under heavy financial struggles, were forced to give up their Serie C2 membership.

U.S. Fermana 2006 

A new club, named Unione Sportiva Fermana 2006, was founded in 2006 and admitted to Group A of amateur regional Prima Categoria (8th level of Italian football). They were promoted to Promozione in 2006–07, missing the chance to be promoted to Eccellenza after being defeated 2–1 (aggregate score) by Cuprense in the playoff finals. In season 2007–2008, Fermana won the championship and it is promoted in Eccellenza, but Fermana ended the season in 7th place after a disastrous year behind rival Sambenedettese (who won the championship).

In 2010–2011, Fermana drew the game with Ancona 2–2, and lost the championship by one point. The 2011–2012 season opened with the Fermana in a more balanced league victory. In 2012–13 season it won Coppa Italia Dilettanti, but went bankrupt at the end of the season.

Fermana F.C. 
In summer 2013 the club was refounded as Fermana Football Club after the merger of A.S.D. Montegranaro Calcio 1965 (winner of Eccellenza playoffs) and AFC Fermo restarting from Serie D. The club were Group F champions in 2016–17 Serie D and returned to the Italian third tier for the first time in 12 years.

Colors and badge 
The colors of the club are yellow and blue.

Current squad

Out on loan

Honours 

 Coppa Italia Dilettanti:
Champion : 2012–13

References

External links 
 Official site

Football clubs in Italy
Fermo
Association football clubs established in 1920
Serie B clubs
Serie C clubs
Serie D clubs
1924 establishments in Italy
Phoenix clubs (association football)
2006 establishments in Italy
2013 establishments in Italy